Disagree is a Malaysian  progressive rock band which performs mostly in English.

The band released their second album (their last), To Prevent The Earth From Moving With You, on June 30, 2009.

History
In 1995, Disagree was founded by two high-school students, Zahid and Hamka. Together with other band members Dann and Amir, the quartet gigged and KL and recorded their first demo, Never Cry Wolf in 1996. According to Zahid, the studio in which they recorded it was Bach & Traz, and it appeared that they were the last band to record in the studio which closed down a week later. He added that they managed to record 10 songs, of which only two were salvaged for the frequent gigging list.

It was not until interest was sparked in 1997 by Miracle Music, a small independent label, did Disagree record their 2nd demo, untitled. However, the dream faded quickly due to internal label obscurities and their hopes were dashed. Since then, members were focusing their interests on other things and the band took a hiatus from the scene for two years.

Disagree resurfaced when Zahid and Hamka responded to a rumour that a rock concert would be held somewhere in Kuala Lumpur. In fact, there was really one, which is the first Rock the World being held in 1 Utama just outside the capital. The band played to 10,000 people, who then motivated the band to come together again and record music. However, Dann and Amir departed soon after, eventually replaced by Aziz and Ashroff.

In 2001, Disagree made a new demo called Homemade Jam that quickly gained popularity. The demo gained radio airplay on the now-defunct Wow FM as well as hitz.fm and various magazines voted the demo the most popular and groundbreaking demo to be reviewed.

The band started to become more actively involved in the scene as they stepped into the shoes of gig organizers. In 2002, they promoted their music in the Fat Ant Music Festival. Later that same year, Disagree opened for 'Rock the World II', one of their biggest achievements to date and continued to join the line-up for subsequent Rock the Worlds. Since then they have become a staple offering in the annual Rock the World.

It was around the time of Rock the World III when Fat Boys Records, an independent label run by Jason Lo who signed grunge bands Naked Breed, showed interest on Disagree.

With talks beginning in 2003, Disagree went prepared to record of their début album. Within 10  months, including the mastering in California, they completed their debut 11-track album At the End of the Day for release on 10 February 2004.

In 2005, Disagree began picking up awards beginning with the Award for Most Airplay in hitz.fm's inaugural Malaysian English Top 10 Awards, followed by Best New English Language Artiste at the 12th Anugerah Industri Muzik.

In 2006, they collaborated with Pop Shuvit to make a song and music video dedicated to football (soccer) fans during the 2006 FIFA World Cup. The song was titled Football Mad Nation and the making of the song and video was sponsored by Celcom.

In 2007, Disagree became part of Nokia You Make It Reel, a competition for aspiring music video directors. Later that same year, they joined Ikon Malaysia.

They launched their 2nd album, To Prevent The Earth From Moving With You in 2009.

Band members

Current members
Zahid (Lead Vocals, Lead Guitar) (1995–2011)
Hamka (Drums) (1995–2011)
Effi Nazrel Saharudin (Bass) (2000–2011)
David (Rhythm Guitar) (2008–2011)

Former members
Dann (Rhythm Guitar) (1995–1999)
Amir (Bass) (1995–1999)
Ashroff (Rhythm Guitar) (2000–2008)

Discography

Studio albums
2004: At the End of the Day
2009: To Prevent The Earth From Moving With You

Other Releases
1996: Never Cry Wolf
2002: Homemade Jam

References

External links
Official website
Disagree's Myspace site

Malaysian alternative rock groups
Musical groups established in 1995
Malaysian progressive rock groups
Musical groups disestablished in 2011